The Floronic Man (Jason Woodrue), also known as the Plant Master, Floro, and the Seeder, is a supervillain appearing in American comic books published by DC Comics.

The character has been portrayed in live-action by John Glover in the 1997 film Batman & Robin and Kevin Durand in the DC Universe series Swamp Thing.

Publication history
He first appeared as an enemy of the Atom in The Atom #1 and was created by Gardner Fox and Gil Kane. His Floronic Man appearance first appeared in the Green Lantern backup in The Flash #245. His Seeder appearance first appeared in Swamp Thing #21. He became known as "Floro" and a superhero, in The New Guardians.

Fictional character biography
Jason Woodrue first appears in The Atom #1 (June–July 1962). Woodrue is an exile from an interdimensional world (Floria) inhabited by dryads. Woodrue, sometimes called the Plant Master, uses his advanced botanical knowledge to control plant growth in an attempt to take over the world. He is defeated by the superhero Atom. The Plant Master returns to face the Atom and the Justice League.

In The Flash #245 (November 1976), Woodrue uses an experimental formula to transform his body into a plant/human hybrid, with his skin resembling bark and his hair turning into leaves. Now calling himself the Floronic Man, he is defeated by Green Lantern. After a rematch with the Atom and Wonder Woman, the Floronic Man later becomes a member of the Secret Society of Super-Villains.

In Alan Moore's relaunch of the Swamp Thing in The Saga of the Swamp Thing (vol. 2) #21 (February 1984), Woodrue is hired by General Avery Sunderland to discover how scientist Alec Holland had been turned into the Swamp Thing. Woodrue discovers that the creature, instead of being a mutated version of Holland, is rather an intelligent mass of plant life that had fed on Holland's dead body and absorbed his knowledge and memories. The Floronic Man tries to warn Sunderland that the Swamp Thing is not dead, but the General refuses to listen and announces his intent to terminate Woodrue's employment. Subsequently, the Floronic Man traps Sunderland in his office with a thawed and enraged Swamp Thing, who kills the General.

In The Saga of the Swamp Thing (vol. 2) #22 (March 1984), the Floronic Man uses the Swamp Thing's body—now regressing to a plant-like state due to his inability to accept the new revelation about his origins, Woodrue literally eating parts of him—to contact the Green, which is composed of the life force of all plants on Earth. The experience drives the Floronic Man insane; he refers to himself as "Wood-Rue", and sets out to destroy all non-plant life on Earth by forcing the plants to produce an excess amount of oxygen to force humans and animals into extinction, in the belief that he is "saving" Earth from mankind. Woodrue is confronted by a revived Swamp Thing, who reveals to the Green that plants cannot survive without humans and animals, as his actions would deprive them of the carbon dioxide that they require to breathe that comes from humans and animals, forcing Woodrue to acknowledge that his actions are the actions of a man rather than a plant. The Green abandons the Floronic Man, who is then taken into custody by the Justice League after undergoing a complete mental breakdown.

The 1988 Neil Gaiman/Dave McKean miniseries Black Orchid recasts Dr. Jason Woodrue as a university professor who taught botany to Philip Sylvian, Alec and Linda Holland, and Pamela Isley. The character Philip Sylvian, apparently unaware of Woodrue's transformation, refers to him as a "poor old guy" and states: "Last I heard he was in Arkham Insane Asylum..."

The Floronic Man was briefly a hero after the events of Millennium, which led to him to become a member of the New Guardians. In this new role, Woodrue takes on the name Floro. After the death of most of his teammates, he reverts to his original status as a villain.

The Floronic Man returns in Batman: Shadow of the Bat #56 (November 1996). After breaking Poison Ivy out of Arkham with his two underlings Holly and Eva, the Floronic Man explains his past to the Batman and Poison Ivy, telling the story of how he prevented a plot of the Swamp Thing's, only to be killed soon. After scientists manage to keep his head alive, the first thing he comes in contact with is marijuana. Regenerating a plant body, he begins his quest to flood the streets of Gotham City with his advanced and cheap pot. The Floronic Man takes some of Poison Ivy's DNA in an attempt to create a "child". Poison Ivy, in exchange, gets a trunk full of dope money, and is free to walk away. Deciding that she does not want the Floronic Man running the world, she frees the Batman. After a short battle, the Batman notices that the Floronic Man is standing in a puddle, and uses an electrical cable to electrocute the villain, then kills him once again.

The character has since appeared in various other comics and storylines. He assists Starman, Alan Scott, the Batman and others in trying to save a friendly, peaceful version of Solomon Grundy. In a recent issue of Batman, he is killed after assassins shoot him repeatedly with bullets, although this is in direct contrast to his most famous appearance (in The Saga of the Swamp Thing #21) in which he points out that "you can't kill a vegetable by shooting it through the head".  He is one of the many villains who was mind-wiped by the JLA, but he has since recovered those memories.

During Infinite Crisis, the Floronic Man appears as a member of Alexander Luthor Jr.'s Secret Society of Super Villains and takes part in the Battle of Metropolis.

In the Post-Infinite Crisis DCU, he is responsible for Pamela Isley's transformation into Poison Ivy.

In The New 52 (a 2011 reboot of the DC Comics universe), Woodrue is re-introduced making a deal with the Green by taking care of Alec Holland. Woodrue is later revealed to be the Seeder, now endowed with power by the Parliament of Trees. The Swamp Thing had been hunting him for disrupting the balance of the Green. The Parliament of Trees decides that he and the Swamp Thing must fight, once they have fully realized their powers, to decide who shall be the champion of the Green. As he did in his previous incarnation, he briefly takes the powers of the Swamp Thing, becoming the Champion of the Green, before the Swamp Thing tricks him from within the Green and steals back the title, which nearly kills the Seeder, until the Swamp Thing places him within the Green to save him. He later re-emerges to fight alongside the Swamp Thing against the combined forces of the Metal, the Gray/Fungi and the Rot. He fights the Avatar of the Gray, resulting in both of their deaths.

Powers and abilities
In his original form, Jason Woodrue has advanced knowledge of botany, which he utilizes it to accelerate plant growth. After becoming the Floronic Man, Woodrue gained the ability to merge with and mentally control plants. When he ate the Swamp Thing's "organs", his powers have been expanded, thus allowing him to manipulate plants all over the world for a time. But, these capabilities were lost, thanks to the Swamp Thing.

In other media

Television
 A character loosely based on Jason Woodrue as Plant Master named Straal appears in The Superman/Aquaman Hour of Adventure episode "The Plant Master", voiced by Ted Knight. He is a scientist who discovered a way to use wave patterns to increase plant growth.
 Jason Woodrue appears in Swamp Thing, portrayed by Kevin Durand. This version seeks to use the properties of Marais, Louisiana's swamp to cure his wife Carolyn's Alzheimer's disease. After learning of the eponymous Swamp Thing, Woodrue collects and eats some of the former's plant matter before attempting to force Carolyn to do the same, only to be interrupted by Abby Arcane and the Maris Police Department. Woodrue later experiments on himself and transforms into the Floronic Man.

Film

 Jason Woodrue appears in Batman & Robin, portrayed by John Glover. This version is a Wayne Enterprises mad scientist who operates in the Amazon rainforest and uses plant toxins to create a super-soldier serum called "Venom". While experimenting on Bane, Woodrue's assistant Pamela Isley discovers his criminal nature. He shoves her into a shelf of various chemicals, such as Venom, in an attempt to kill her, but she transforms into Poison Ivy, kills Woodrue, and escapes with Bane.
 Jason Woodrue as the Floronic Man was reportedly featured in David S. Goyer's script for an unproduced Green Arrow film project entitled Escape from Super Max as an inmate of the titular Super Max Penitentiary for Metahumans.
 Jason Woodrue as the Floronic Man was planned to appear in Guillermo del Toro's film Justice League Dark.
 Jason Woodrue as the Floronic Man appears in Batman and Harley Quinn, voiced by Kevin Michael Richardson.

Miscellaneous 
Jason Woodrue as the Floronic Man appears in Justice League Adventures #6.

References

External links
Floronic Man at Comic Vine

DC Comics aliens
DC Comics metahumans
DC Comics characters who are shapeshifters
DC Comics characters with accelerated healing
DC Comics plant characters
DC Comics extraterrestrial supervillains
DC Comics male supervillains
DC Comics scientists
Fictional characters who can duplicate themselves
Fictional characters with immortality
Fictional characters with plant abilities
Fictional mad scientists
Fictional mass murderers
Fictional cannabis users
Superhero film characters
Comics characters introduced in 1962
Characters created by Gil Kane
Characters created by Gardner Fox